Big Brother 2004 may refer to two reality TV shows:

 Big Brother 2004 Australia
 Big Brother 2004 (UK)